Alexis Vega (born 1 May 1993) is an Argentine professional footballer who plays as a midfielder for Santamarina.

Career
Vega had youth stints with Tigre and Defensores de Belgrano. He then joined El Porvenir, where he featured thirty-two times in Primera D Metropolitana. 2016 saw Vega join All Boys. After making his professional league bow on 20 February against Villa Dálmine, the midfielder went on to make fifty-two appearances in three Primera B Nacional seasons. Midway through 2017–18, Vega signed with Primera B de Chile side San Marcos. His sole campaign with them, 2018, concluded with relegation to the Segunda División, with him scoring goals against Deportes Copiapó, Santiago Morning and Deportes Valdivia across twenty-eight matches.

Vega returned to Argentina with Brown in January 2019.

Career statistics
.

References

External links

1993 births
Living people
Sportspeople from Buenos Aires Province
Argentine footballers
Association football midfielders
Argentine expatriate footballers
Expatriate footballers in Chile
Argentine expatriate sportspeople in Chile
Primera D Metropolitana players
Primera Nacional players
Primera B de Chile players
El Porvenir footballers
All Boys footballers
San Marcos de Arica footballers
Club Atlético Brown footballers
Club Atlético Temperley footballers
Chacarita Juniors footballers
Deportivo Riestra players
Club y Biblioteca Ramón Santamarina footballers